Nathan W. Jewett (December 25, 1844 – February 23, 1914) was a professional baseball player born in New York City who played catcher in the National Association of Professional Base Ball Players for the 1872 Brooklyn Eckfords. On May 28, 1861, he enlisted in the 71st Pennsylvania Infantry Regiment.

He died at the age of 69 in the Bronx, New York and is buried at the Kensico Cemetery in Valhalla, New York.

References

External links

Major League Baseball catchers
New York Mutuals (NABBP) players
Brooklyn Eckfords (NABBP) players
Brooklyn Eckfords players
Baseball players from New York (state)
19th-century baseball players
1844 births
1914 deaths
Union Army soldiers